The American intelligence analysts who compiled the justifications for continuing to detain the captives taken in the War on Terror made dozens of references to an al Qaida safe house, in Faisalabad, Punjab, Pakistan.

Five of the twenty men who face charges before Guantanamo military commissions were captured in a single raid on a safe house in Faisalabad.

American and Pakistani counter-terrorism officials have made multiple raids on suspected safe houses in Faisalabad.

One large raid, of what counter-terrorism officials described as an "al-Qaida safe house", netted dozens of foreigners, from around the world, who the counter-terrorism officials described as suspicious. The captives however, during their Combatant Status Review Tribunals, disputed that living with other foreigners should be a trigger for suspicions, when they were all foreign students living in Salafi University's foreign students' dormitory.

Captives apprehended with Abu Zubaydah
Abu Zubaydah was captured with close to two dozen other individuals in raids by Pakistani security forces on several Faisalabad safe houses.

The Israeli newspaper Haaretz described this house as a "Lashkar a-Tayeb safe house".

References

2000s in Punjab, Pakistan
21st century in Faisalabad
Al-Qaeda safe houses
Al-Qaeda facilities
Buildings and structures in Faisalabad
Safe houses in Pakistan
Lashkar-e-Taiba